Evgenyi Romanov (born 20 July 1985) is a Russian professional boxer. As an amateur, Romanov won gold at the Junior World Championship in 2004 and the Russian Championships 2009 in the heavyweight division.

Amateur career
At the world junior championships in 2004, Romanov stopped all his opponents with his vaunted power, including Robert Alfonso.

On a national level Romanov had the problem that Russian amateur boxing is so talent-laden.
At the Russian nationals 2005 (seniors, 90 kg) he beat future Olympic gold medallist Rakhim Chakkhiev 36-17 in the semifinal but lost the final to world and European champion Aleksandr Alekseyev. In 2006 he lost the final to world silver medallist Roman Romanchuk, in 2007 he beat Sergey Kalchugin but exited early in the quarters against unknown Musalchi Magomedov.
At the Russian nationals 2008 he lost the final to future European and World Champion Egor Mekhontsev 5-19. In the absence of Mekhontsev he beat Kalchugin again to win his first Russian Senior Championship in 2009.

Romanov holds a win over Deontay Wilder at the amateur level via knockout in 2008.

Professional career 
Romanov made his professional debut against Viktar Chvarkou on 30 July 2016, and won the fight by a third-round technical knockout. Romanov amassed an 11-0 record during the next two years, with eight of those victories coming by way of stoppage.

Romanov was scheduled to face Dillon Carman for the inaugural WBO Global heavyweight title on 22 February 2019, at the KRK “Uralets” in Ekaterinburg, Russia. The fight was set as a ten-round bout, for the first time in Romanov's career. He won the fight by a first-round knockout. 

Romanov made his first WBO Global title defense against Ariel Bracamonte on 16 June  2019. Romanov beat the much bigger Bracamonte by unanimous decision, with all three judges awarding him a 99-90 scorecard. 

Romanov was scheduled to face Dario German Balmaceda in a non-title bout on 24 August  2019, at the Traktor Sport Palace in Chelyabinsk, Russia. He won the fight by a first-round technical knockout. Romanov made his second and last WBO Global title defense against Siarhei Liakhovich on 7 November 2020. He won the fight by a second-round knockout.

It was announced on 5 April 2021, that Romanov would face Dmitry Kudryashov for the inaugural WBC Silver bridgerweight title, as well as the position of mandatory challenger. The fight was scheduled for 21 May 2021, and was contested at the Khimki Basketball Center in Khimki, Russia. He won the fight by a wide unanimous decision, with scores of 120-108, 119-109 and 119-109.

The WBC briderweight champion Óscar Rivas was officially ordered to make his first title defense against Romanov on 16 November 2021. The two camps came to an agreement, regarding the terms of the fight, on 15 February  2022. The bout is expected to take place in June 2022.

Professional boxing record

References

Living people
Heavyweight boxers
Russian male boxers
1985 births
Sportspeople from Volgograd
Bridgerweight boxers